St-Robert is an ordinary chondrite meteorite fell on Quebec on June 14, 1994.

History
The entry of a ~2 tonne meteoroid into the earth's atmosphere produced a daylight fireball visible from Quebec, Ontario, New Hampshire, Vermont and New York. A sonic boom shook the entire Montreal region as the fireball passed overhead. The fireball was recorded by satellites maintained by the U.S. Department of Defense and seismographic stations within Canada. Observers in the area of Saint-Robert who witnessed the terminal explosion also heard the fragments falling and striking the earth.

The stone was cold to the touch. Over the next three months 20 other stones were recovered from shallow pits, with largest weighing .

See also
 Glossary of meteoritics
 Meteorite fall

References

Meteorites found in Canada
1994 in Canada